The , was the seventh annual professional wrestling single-elimination tournament promoted by World Wonder Ring Stardom which took place beginning with April 10 and culminating on June 12 in the Ota City General Gymnasium. The tournament expanded out of the normal single night format to instead be determined over two separate dates with a limited attendance due in part to the ongoing COVID-19 pandemic at the time.

The tournament winner is awarded a wish that has prompted opportunities for the championship of their choice. Night 2 was postponed due to the Japanese government announcing a state of emergency for Tokyo lasting from April 25 until May 11. The rest of the tournament was rescheduled to May 14 and June 12, with the second-round and quarter-finals matches taking place on May 14. The semi-finals and finals were initially going to take place on May 29, but the extension of the state of emergency postponed the third night of the event to June 12.

Storylines
The show featured professional wrestling matches that resulted from scripted storylines, where wrestlers portrayed villains, heroes, or less distinguishable characters in the scripted events that built tension and culminated in a wrestling match or series of matches. 

On the second night of the tournament, former High Speed Champion Koguma made her in-ring return, saving Mayu Iwatani from an attack performed by Oedo Tai after she fell short to Himeka in the quarter-finals of the tournament. Koguma was later revealed to have joined STARS.

On the third night of the tournament which took place on June 12 due to delays caused by the COVID-19 pandemic in Japan, STARS and Oedo Tai culminated their feud in a ten-woman All-Out War elimination tag team match won by Natsuko Tora who lastly eliminated Starlight Kid, therefore forcing her to join Oedo Tai. The show saw Saya Kamitani defeating Himeka in the semi-finals of the tournament and finally Maika in the finals to become the Cinderella Tournament winner of 2021. Kamitani issued a challenge to Tam Nakano for the Wonder of Stardom Championship as her granted wish for winning the tournament. The main event of the evening portraited the collision between Utami Hayashishita and Syuri for the World of Stardom Championship. The two of them went into a thirty-minute time-limit draw and Syuri requested a restart of the match which Hayashishita accepted. The second match ended in a double count-out as both of the competitors were unable to continue. After retaining the title, Hayashishita saw Natsuko Tora coming to challenge her for the red belt holding Starlight Kid's mask in her hand. 

The first match between Syuri and Hayashishita received a 5.5 stars rating from Dave Meltzer, making it the highest-rated match in the history of women's professional wrestling till it's date.

Participants
The tournament featured twenty wrestlers, being the greatest Cinderella Tournament till date. Despite Bea Priestley announcing her departure from World Wonder Ring Stardom at Stardom Yokohama Dream Cinderella 2021 from April 4, she was still listed as a participant. 

Ruaka and Hanan, previously listed as reserves, were announced on 7 April 2021, as replacements for the departing Bea Priestley and the injured Saya Iida.

Participants list
*Noted underneath are the champions who held their titles at the time of the tournament.
{| class="wikitable sortable" align="left center" style="width:32%;"
|-
!width:7%;"|Wrestler
!width:7%;"|Unit
!width:25%;"|Notes
|-
|AZM
|Queen's Quest
|
|-
|Gokigen Death
|Oedo Tai
|
|-
|Giulia
|Donna Del Mondo
|Goddess of Stardom Champion
|-
|Himeka
|Donna Del Mondo
|
|-
|Hanan
|Stars
|
|-
|Konami
|Oedo Tai
|
|-
|Maika
|Donna Del Mondo
|
|-
|Mayu Iwatani
|Stars
|
|-
|Mina Shirakawa
|Cosmic Angels
|Artist of Stardom Champion
|-
|Momo Watanabe
|Queen's Quest
|
|-
|Natsuko Tora
|Oedo Tai
|
|-
|Natsupoi
|Donna Del Mondo
|High Speed Champion
|-
|Ruaka
|Oedo Tai
|
|-
|Saki Kashima
|Oedo Tai
|
|-style="background: gold"
|Saya Kamitani
|Queen's Quest
|Winner
|-
|Starlight Kid
|Stars
|
|-
|Syuri
|Donna Del Mondo
|Goddess of Stardom ChampionSWA World Champion
|-
|Tam Nakano
|Cosmic Angels
|Wonder of Stardom ChampionArtist of Stardom Champion
|-
|Unagi Sayaka
|Cosmic Angels
|Artist of Stardom Champion
|-
|Utami Hayashishita
|Queen's Quest
|World of Stardom Champion

Future of Stardom Championship Tournament
Due to Saya Iida relinquishing the Future of Stardom Championship due to injury, a seven-woman tournament to crown a new champion was announced to kick off on the second night of the event. The finals of the tournament will take place on July 4 at Yokohama Dream Cinderella 2021 in Summer.

Results

The match schedule of the first night was announced on April 7 after a press conference.

Notes

References

External links
Page Stardom World

2021 in professional wrestling
Women's professional wrestling shows
World Wonder Ring Stardom shows
World Wonder Ring Stardom
Women's professional wrestling tournaments